The High Bridge School District is a comprehensive community public school district that serves students in pre-kindergarten through eighth grade from High Bridge, in Hunterdon County, New Jersey, United States.

As of the 2018–19 school year, the district, comprised of two schools, had an enrollment of 370 students and 38.2 classroom teachers (on an FTE basis), for a student–teacher ratio of 9.7:1.

The district is classified by the New Jersey Department of Education as being in District Factor Group "GH", the third-highest of eight groupings. District Factor Groups organize districts statewide to allow comparison by common socioeconomic characteristics of the local districts. From lowest socioeconomic status to highest, the categories are A, B, CD, DE, FG, GH, I and J.

Public school students in ninth through twelfth grades attend Voorhees High School, which also serves students from Califon, Glen Gardner, Hampton, Lebanon Township and Tewksbury Township. As of the 2018–19 school year, the high school had an enrollment of 982 students and 83.1 classroom teachers (on an FTE basis), for a student–teacher ratio of 11.8:1. The school is part of the North Hunterdon-Voorhees Regional High School District, which also includes students from Bethlehem Township, Clinton Town, Clinton Township, Franklin Township, Lebanon Borough and Union Township who attend North Hunterdon High School in Annandale.

Schools
Schools in the districts (with 2018–19 enrollment data from the National Center for Education Statistics) are:
Elementary school
High Bridge Elementary School with 194 students in grades PreK - 4
Gregory A. Hobaugh, Principal
Middle school
High Bridge Middle School with 178 students in  grades 5 - 8
Richard J. Kolton, Principal

Administration
Core members of the district's administration are:
Dr. Gregory Hobaugh, Superintendent
John Jennings, Business Administrator / Board Secretary

Board of education
The district's board of education, comprised of nine members, sets policy and oversees the fiscal and educational operation of the district through its administration. As a Type II school district, the board's trustees are elected directly by voters to serve three-year terms of office on a staggered basis, with three seats up for election each year held (since 2012) as part of the November general election.

References

External links
High Bridge School District

School Data for the High Bridge School District, National Center for Education Statistics
North Hunterdon-Voorhees Regional High School District

High Bridge, New Jersey
New Jersey District Factor Group GH
School districts in Hunterdon County, New Jersey